Marie-Françoise Grange-Prigent (born 9 June 1961) is a French slalom canoeist who competed from the early 1980s to the early 1990s. She won six medals at the ICF Canoe Slalom World Championships with three golds (K-1 team: 1983, 1985, 1989) two silvers (K-1: 1985, K-1 team: 1987) and a bronze (K-1: 1983).

References

External links 
 Marie-Francoise GRANGE-PRIGENT at CanoeSlalom.net

1961 births
Living people
French female canoeists
Medalists at the ICF Canoe Slalom World Championships
Knights of the Ordre national du Mérite